Naldinho is a nickname. It may refer to:

 Naldinho (footballer, born 1990), Erivonaldo Florencio de Oliveira Filho, Brazilian football midfielder
 Naldinho (footballer, born 1992), Leonardo Benedito da Silva, Brazilian football forward